Saxifragales (saxifrages) is an order of flowering plants (Angiosperms). They are an extremely diverse group of plants which include trees, shrubs, perennial herbs, succulent and aquatic plants. The degree of diversity in terms of vegetative and floral features makes it difficult to define common features that unify the order.

In the Angiosperm Phylogeny Group classification system, the Saxifragales are placed within the major division  of flowering plants referred to as eudicots, specifically the core eudicots. This subgroup consists of the Dilleniaceae, superasterids and superrosids. The superrosids in turn have two components, rosids and Saxifragales. The Saxifragales order has undergone considerable revision since its original classification based purely on plant morphology, to a classification based on molecular phylogenetics. There is an extensive fossil record from the Turonian-Campanian (late Cretaceous) time, about 90 million years ago (Myr), but molecular studies suggest an earlier origin in the early Cretaceous (102–108 Myr) with rapid early diversification to more modern forms.

The order Saxifragales consists of 15 families, about 100 genera and 2,470 species. Of the 15 families, many are small, with 8 having only a single genus, the largest family being the Crassulaceae (stonecrops) with about 35 genera. Saxifragales are found worldwide, though rarely in the tropics, and in a wide variety of habitats from desert to aquatic. They also have a wide variety of uses, from timber to foodstuffs and ornamental plants.

The anthophytes are a grouping of plant taxa bearing flower-like reproductive structures. They were formerly thought to be a clade comprising plants bearing flower-like structures.  The group contained the angiosperms - the extant flowering plants, such as roses and grasses - as well as the Gnetales and the extinct Bennettitales.

23,420 species of vascular plant have been recorded in South Africa, making it the sixth most species-rich country in the world and the most species-rich country on the African continent. Of these, 153 species are considered to be threatened. Nine biomes have been described in South Africa: Fynbos, Succulent Karoo, desert, Nama Karoo, grassland, savanna, Albany thickets, the Indian Ocean coastal belt, and forests.

The 2018 South African National Biodiversity Institute's National Biodiversity Assessment plant checklist lists 35,130 taxa in the phyla Anthocerotophyta (hornworts (6)), Anthophyta (flowering plants (33534)), Bryophyta (mosses (685)), Cycadophyta (cycads (42)), Lycopodiophyta (Lycophytes(45)), Marchantiophyta (liverworts (376)), Pinophyta (conifers (33)), and Pteridophyta (cryptogams (408)).

Four families are represented in the literature. Listed taxa include species, subspecies, varieties, and forms as recorded, some of which have subsequently been allocated to other taxa as synonyms, in which cases the accepted taxon is appended to the listing. Multiple entries under alternative names reflect taxonomic revision over time.

Altingiaceae
 Family: Altingiaceae,

Liquidambar
Genus Liquidambar:
 Liquidambar styraciflua L. not indigenous, cultivated, naturalised, invasive

Crassulaceae
 Family: Crassulaceae,

Adromischus
Genus Adromischus:
 Adromischus alstonii (Schonland & Baker f.) C.A.Sm. indigenous
 Adromischus bicolor Hutchison, endemic
 Adromischus caryophyllaceus (Burm.f.) Lem. endemic
 Adromischus cooperi (Baker) A.Berger, endemic
 Adromischus cristatus (Haw.) Lem. endemic
 Adromischus cristatus (Haw.) Lem. var. clavifolius (Haw.) Toelken, endemic
 Adromischus cristatus (Haw.) Lem. var. cristatus, endemic
 Adromischus cristatus (Haw.) Lem. var. mzimvubuensis Van Jaarsv. endemic
 Adromischus cristatus (Haw.) Lem. var. schonlandii (E.Phillips) Toelken, endemic
 Adromischus cristatus (Haw.) Lem. var. zeyheri (Harv.) Toelken, endemic
 Adromischus diabolicus Toelken, endemic
 Adromischus fallax Toelken, endemic
 Adromischus filicaulis (Eckl. & Zeyh.) C.A.Sm. indigenous
 Adromischus filicaulis (Eckl. & Zeyh.) C.A.Sm. subsp. filicaulis, endemic
 Adromischus filicaulis (Eckl. & Zeyh.) C.A.Sm. subsp. marlothii (Schonland) Toelken, endemic
 Adromischus hemisphaericus (L.) Lem. endemic
 Adromischus humilis (Marloth) Poelln. endemic
 Adromischus inamoenus Toelken, endemic
 Adromischus leucophyllus Uitewaal, endemic
 Adromischus liebenbergii Hutchison, endemic
 Adromischus liebenbergii Hutchison subsp. liebenbergii, endemic
 Adromischus liebenbergii Hutchison subsp. orientalis Van Jaarsv. endemic
 Adromischus maculatus (Salm-Dyck) Lem. endemic
 Adromischus mammillaris (L.f.) Lem. endemic
 Adromischus marianiae (Marloth) A.Berger, indigenous
 Adromischus marianiae (Marloth) A.Berger var. hallii (Hutchison) Toelken, indigenous
 Adromischus marianiae (Marloth) A.Berger var. immaculatus Uitewaal, endemic
 Adromischus marianiae (Marloth) A.Berger var. kubusensis (Uitewaal) Toelken, indigenous
 Adromischus marianiae (Marloth) A.Berger var. marianiae, endemic
 Adromischus maximus Hutchison, endemic
 Adromischus montium-klinghardtii (Dinter) A.Berger, indigenous
 Adromischus nanus (N.E.Br.) Poelln. endemic
 Adromischus phillipsiae (Marloth) Poelln. endemic
 Adromischus roaneanus Uitewaal, endemic
 Adromischus sphenophyllus C.A.Sm. endemic
 Adromischus subdistichus Makin ex Bruyns, endemic
 Adromischus subviridis Toelken, endemic
 Adromischus triflorus (L.f.) A.Berger, endemic
 Adromischus trigynus (Burch.) Poelln. indigenous
 Adromischus umbraticola C.A.Sm. endemic
 Adromischus umbraticola C.A.Sm. subsp. ramosus Toelken, endemic
 Adromischus umbraticola C.A.Sm. subsp. umbraticola, endemic

Aeonium
Genus Aeonium:
 Aeonium arboreum (L.) Webb & Berthel. not indigenous, cultivated, naturalised

Bryophyllum
Genus Bryophyllum:
 Bryophyllum delagoense (Eckl. & Zeyh.) Schinz, not indigenous, cultivated, naturalised, invasive
 Bryophyllum fedtschenkoi (Raym.-Hamet & Perr.) Lauz.-March. not indigenous, cultivated, naturalised
 Bryophyllum pinnatum (Lam.) Oken, not indigenous, cultivated, naturalised, invasive
 Bryophyllum proliferum Bowie ex Hook. not indigenous, cultivated, naturalised, invasive

Cotyledon
Genus Cotyledon:
 Cotyledon adscendens R.A.Dyer, endemic
 Cotyledon adscendens Van Jaarsv. & Eggli, accepted as Cotyledon xanthantha Van Jaarsv. & Eggli, endemic
 Cotyledon arborescens Mill. accepted as Crassula arborescens (Mill.) Willd. subsp. arborescens, indigenous
 Cotyledon barbeyi Schweinf. ex Baker, indigenous
 Cotyledon barbeyi Schweinf. ex Baker var. soutpansbergensis Van Jaarsv. & A.E.van Wyk, endemic
 Cotyledon campanulata Marloth, endemic
 Cotyledon cuneata Thunb. endemic
 Cotyledon egglii Van Jaarsv. endemic
 Cotyledon eliseae Van Jaarsv. endemic
 Cotyledon gloeophylla Van Jaarsv. endemic
 Cotyledon lutea Van Jaarsv. accepted as Cotyledon xanthantha Van Jaarsv. & Eggli, endemic
 Cotyledon orbiculata L. indigenous
 Cotyledon orbiculata L. var. dactylopsis Toelken, endemic
 Cotyledon orbiculata L. var. flanaganii (Schonland & Baker f.) Toelken, endemic
 Cotyledon orbiculata L. var. oblonga (Haw.) DC. indigenous
 Cotyledon orbiculata L. var. orbiculata, indigenous
 Cotyledon orbiculata L. var. spuria (L.) Toelken, endemic
 Cotyledon ovata Mill. accepted as Crassula ovata (Mill.) Druce, indigenous
 Cotyledon papillaris L.f. indigenous
 Cotyledon pendens Van Jaarsv. endemic
 Cotyledon petiolaris Van Jaarsv. endemic
 Cotyledon rhombifolia Haw. accepted as Adromischus rhombifolius (Haw.) Lem. 
 Cotyledon tomentosa Harv. indigenous
 Cotyledon tomentosa Harv. subsp. ladismithiensis (Poelln.) Toelken, endemic
 Cotyledon tomentosa Harv. subsp. tomentosa, endemic
 Cotyledon velutina Hook.f. endemic
 Cotyledon woodii Schonland & Baker f. endemic
 Cotyledon xanthantha Van Jaarsv. & Eggli, endemic

Crassula
Genus Crassula:
 Crassula acinaciformis Schinz, indigenous
 Crassula alba Forssk. var. alba, indigenous
 Crassula alba Forssk. var. pallida Toelken, indigenous
 Crassula alba Forssk. var. parvisepala (Schonland) Toelken, indigenous
 Crassula alcicornis Schonland, endemic
 Crassula alpestris Thunb. indigenous
 Crassula alpestris Thunb. subsp. alpestris, endemic
 Crassula alpestris Thunb. subsp. massonii (Britten & Baker f.) Toelken, endemic
 Crassula alstonii Marloth, endemic
 Crassula ammophila Toelken, endemic
 Crassula aphylla Schonland & Baker f. endemic
 Crassula arborea Medik. accepted as Crassula arborescens (Mill.) Willd. subsp. arborescens, indigenous
 Crassula arborescens (Mill.) Willd. endemic
 Crassula arborescens (Mill.) Willd. subsp. arborescens, endemic
 Crassula arborescens (Mill.) Willd. subsp. undulatifolia Toelken, endemic
 Crassula argentea Thunb. accepted as Crassula ovata (Mill.) Druce, indigenous
 Crassula argyrophylla Diels ex Schonland & Baker f. accepted as Crassula swaziensis Schonland 
 Crassula articulata Zuccagni, accepted as Crassula ovata (Mill.) Druce, indigenous
 Crassula atropurpurea (Haw.) D.Dietr. indigenous
 Crassula atropurpurea (Haw.) D.Dietr. var. anomala (Schonland & Baker f.) Toelken, endemic
 Crassula atropurpurea (Haw.) D.Dietr. var. atropurpurea, endemic
 Crassula atropurpurea (Haw.) D.Dietr. var. cultriformis (Friedrich) Toelken, indigenous
 Crassula atropurpurea (Haw.) D.Dietr. var. muirii (Schonland) R.Fern. endemic
 Crassula atropurpurea (Haw.) D.Dietr. var. purcellii (Schonland) Toelken, endemic
 Crassula atropurpurea (Haw.) D.Dietr. var. watermeyeri (Compton) Toelken, endemic
 Crassula badspoortense Van Jaarsv. endemic
 Crassula barbata Thunb. indigenous
 Crassula barbata Thunb. subsp. barbata, endemic
 Crassula barbata Thunb. subsp. broomii (Schonland) Toelken, endemic
 Crassula barklyi N.E.Br. endemic
 Crassula bergioides Harv. endemic
 Crassula biplanata Haw. endemic
 Crassula brachystachya Toelken, endemic
 Crassula brevifolia Harv. indigenous
 Crassula brevifolia Harv. subsp. brevifolia, indigenous
 Crassula brevifolia Harv. subsp. psammophila Toelken, endemic
 Crassula campestris (Eckl. & Zeyh.) Endl. ex Walp. indigenous
 Crassula capensis (L.) Baill. indigenous
 Crassula capensis (L.) Baill. var. albertiniae (Schonland) Toelken, endemic
 Crassula capensis (L.) Baill. var. capensis, endemic
 Crassula capensis (L.) Baill. var. promontorii (Schonland & Baker f.) Toelken, endemic
 Crassula capitella Thunb. indigenous
 Crassula capitella Thunb. subsp. capitella, endemic
 Crassula capitella Thunb. subsp. enantiophylla (Baker f.) Toelken, accepted as Crassula capitella Thunb. subsp. nodulosa (Schonland) Toelken 
 Crassula capitella Thunb. subsp. meyeri (Harv.) Toelken, endemic
 Crassula capitella Thunb. subsp. nodulosa (Schonland) Toelken, indigenous
 Crassula capitella Thunb. subsp. sessilicymula (Mogg) Toelken, endemic
 Crassula capitella Thunb. subsp. thyrsiflora (Thunb.) Toelken, indigenous
 Crassula ciliata L. endemic
 Crassula clavata N.E.Br. endemic
 Crassula coccinea L. endemic
 Crassula columella Marloth & Schonland, endemic
 Crassula columnaris Thunb. indigenous
 Crassula columnaris Thunb. subsp. columnaris, endemic
 Crassula columnaris Thunb. subsp. prolifera Friedrich, indigenous
 Crassula compacta Schonland, endemic
 Crassula congesta N.E.Br. indigenous
 Crassula congesta N.E.Br. subsp. congesta, endemic
 Crassula congesta N.E.Br. subsp. laticephala (Schonland) Toelken, endemic
 Crassula corallina Thunb. indigenous
 Crassula corallina Thunb. subsp. corallina, indigenous
 Crassula corallina Thunb. subsp. macrorrhiza Toelken, indigenous
 Crassula cordata Thunb. endemic
 Crassula cotyledon Jacq. accepted as Crassula arborescens (Mill.) Willd. subsp. arborescens, indigenous
 Crassula cotyledonifolia Salisb. accepted as Crassula arborescens (Mill.) Willd. subsp. arborescens, indigenous
 Crassula cotyledonis Thunb. indigenous
 Crassula cremnophila Van Jaarsv. & A.E.van Wyk, endemic
 Crassula crenulata Thunb. indigenous
 Crassula cultrata L. endemic
 Crassula cymbiformis Toelken, endemic
 Crassula cymosa P.J.Bergius, endemic
 Crassula deceptor Schonland & Baker f. indigenous
 Crassula decidua Schonland, endemic
 Crassula decumbens Thunb. indigenous
 Crassula decumbens Thunb. var. brachyphylla (Adamson) Toelken, endemic
 Crassula decumbens Thunb. var. decumbens, endemic
 Crassula dejecta Jacq. endemic
 Crassula deltoidea Thunb. indigenous
 Crassula dentata Thunb. endemic
 Crassula dependens Bolus, indigenous
 Crassula depressa (Eckl. & Zeyh.) Toelken, endemic
 Crassula dichotoma L. endemic
 Crassula dodii Schonland & Baker f. endemic
 Crassula elatinoides (Eckl. & Zeyh.) Friedrich, endemic
 Crassula elegans Schonland & Baker f. indigenous
 Crassula elegans Schonland & Baker f. subsp. elegans, indigenous
 Crassula elsieae Toelken, endemic
 Crassula ericoides Haw. indigenous
 Crassula ericoides Haw. subsp. ericoides, endemic
 Crassula ericoides Haw. subsp. tortuosa Toelken, endemic
 Crassula exilis Harv. indigenous
 Crassula exilis Harv. subsp. cooperi (Regel) Toelken, endemic
 Crassula exilis Harv. subsp. exilis, endemic
 Crassula exilis Harv. subsp. picturata (Boom) G.D.Rowley, indigenous
 Crassula exilis Harv. subsp. sedifolia (N.E.Br.) Toelken, indigenous
 Crassula expansa Dryand. indigenous
 Crassula expansa Dryand. subsp. expansa, indigenous
 Crassula expansa Dryand. subsp. filicaulis (Haw.) Toelken, endemic
 Crassula expansa Dryand. subsp. fragilis (Baker) Toelken, indigenous
 Crassula expansa Dryand. subsp. pyrifolia (Compton) Toelken, indigenous
 Crassula fallax Friedrich, endemic
 Crassula fascicularis Lam. endemic
 Crassula filiformis (Eckl. & Zeyh.) D.Dietr. endemic
 Crassula flanaganii Schonland & Baker f. endemic
 Crassula flava L. endemic
 Crassula foveata Van Jaarsv. indigenous
 Crassula fragarioides Van Jaarsv. & Helme, indigenous
 Crassula fusca Herre, indigenous
 Crassula garibina Marloth & Schonland, indigenous
 Crassula garibina Marloth & Schonland subsp. garibina, indigenous
 Crassula garibina Marloth & Schonland subsp. glabra Toelken, endemic
 Crassula gemmifera Friedrich, indigenous
 Crassula glomerata P.J.Bergius, endemic
 Crassula grammanthoides (Schonland) Toelken, endemic
 Crassula grisea Schonland, indigenous
 Crassula hemisphaerica Thunb. endemic
 Crassula hirsuta Schonland & Baker f. endemic
 Crassula hirta Thunb. var. dyeri Schonland, accepted as Crassula werneri N.Jacobsen, indigenous
 Crassula hirtipes Harv. endemic
 Crassula inandensis Schonland & Baker f. endemic
 Crassula inanis Thunb. indigenous
 Crassula intermedia Schonland, endemic
 Crassula lactea Sol. endemic
 Crassula lanceolata (Eckl. & Zeyh.) Endl. ex Walp. indigenous
 Crassula lanceolata (Eckl. & Zeyh.) Endl. ex Walp. subsp. denticulata (Brenan) Toelken, indigenous
 Crassula lanceolata (Eckl. & Zeyh.) Endl. ex Walp. subsp. lanceolata, indigenous
 Crassula lanceolata (Eckl. & Zeyh.) Endl. ex Walp. subsp. transvaalensis (Kuntze) Toelken, indigenous
 Crassula lanuginosa Harv. indigenous
 Crassula lanuginosa Harv. var. lanuginosa, indigenous
 Crassula lanuginosa Harv. var. pachystemon (Schonland & Baker f.) Toelken, endemic
 Crassula lasiantha Drege ex Harv. endemic
 Crassula latibracteata Toelken, endemic
 Crassula lucens Gram, accepted as Crassula ovata (Mill.) Druce, indigenous
 Crassula macowaniana Schonland & Baker f. indigenous
 Crassula maputensis R.Fern. indigenous
 Crassula mesembrianthemopsis Dinter, indigenous
 Crassula mesembryanthemoides (Haw.) D.Dietr. indigenous
 Crassula mesembryanthemoides (Haw.) D.Dietr. subsp. hispida (Haw.) Toelken, endemic
 Crassula mesembryanthemoides (Haw.) D.Dietr. subsp. mesembryanthemoides, endemic
 Crassula minuta Toelken, endemic
 Crassula mollis Thunb. endemic
 Crassula montana Thunb. indigenous
 Crassula montana Thunb. subsp. montana, endemic
 Crassula montana Thunb. subsp. quadrangularis (Schonland) Toelken, endemic
 Crassula multicava Lem. indigenous
 Crassula multicava Lem. subsp. floribunda Friedrich ex Toelken, endemic
 Crassula multicava Lem. subsp. multicava, endemic
 Crassula multiceps Harv. endemic
 Crassula multiflora Schonland & Baker f. indigenous
 Crassula multiflora Schonland & Baker f. subsp. leucantha (Schonland & Baker f.) Toelken, endemic
 Crassula multiflora Schonland & Baker f. subsp. multiflora, endemic
 Crassula muricata Thunb. endemic
 Crassula muscosa L. indigenous
 Crassula muscosa L. var. muscosa, indigenous
 Crassula muscosa L. var. obtusifolia (Harv.) G.D.Rowley, indigenous
 Crassula muscosa L. var. parvula (Eckl. & Zeyh.) Toelken, endemic
 Crassula muscosa L. var. polpodacea (Eckl. & Zeyh.) G.D.Rowley, endemic
 Crassula namaquensis Schonland & Baker f. indigenous
 Crassula namaquensis Schonland & Baker f. subsp. comptonii (Hutch. & Pillans) Toelken, endemic
 Crassula namaquensis Schonland & Baker f. subsp. lutea (Schonland) Toelken, endemic
 Crassula namaquensis Schonland & Baker f. subsp. namaquensis, indigenous
 Crassula natalensis Schonland, indigenous
 Crassula natans Thunb. indigenous
 Crassula natans Thunb. var. minus (Eckl. & Zeyh.) G.D.Rowley, endemic
 Crassula natans Thunb. var. natans, indigenous
 Crassula nemorosa (Eckl. & Zeyh.) Endl. ex Walp. indigenous
 Crassula nitida Schonland, accepted as Crassula ovata (Mill.) Druce, indigenous
 Crassula nodulosa Schonland var. nodulosa forma nodulosa, accepted as Crassula capitella Thunb. subsp. nodulosa (Schonland) Toelken, present
 Crassula nudicaulis L. indigenous
 Crassula nudicaulis L. var. herrei (Friedrich) Toelken, endemic
 Crassula nudicaulis L. var. nudicaulis, indigenous
 Crassula nudicaulis L. var. platyphylla (Harv.) Toelken, endemic
 Crassula oblanceolata Schonland & Baker f. indigenous
 Crassula obliqua Sol. accepted as Crassula ovata (Mill.) Druce, indigenous
 Crassula obovata Haw. indigenous
 Crassula obovata Haw. var. dregeana (Harv.) Toelken, endemic
 Crassula obovata Haw. var. obovata, indigenous
 Crassula obtusa Haw. endemic
 Crassula orbicularis L. endemic
 Crassula ovata (Mill.) Druce, endemic
 Crassula pageae Toelken, endemic
 Crassula pallens Schonland & Baker f. indigenous
 Crassula papillosa Schonland & Baker f. endemic
 Crassula peculiaris (Toelken) Toelken & Wickens, endemic
 Crassula pellucida L. indigenous
 Crassula pellucida L. subsp. alsinoides (Hook.f.) Toelken, indigenous
 Crassula pellucida L. subsp. brachypetala (Drege ex Harv.) Toelken, indigenous
 Crassula pellucida L. subsp. marginalis (Dryand.) Toelken, endemic
 Crassula pellucida L. subsp. pellucida, endemic
 Crassula pellucida L. subsp. spongiosa Toelken, endemic
 Crassula peploides Harv. indigenous
 Crassula perfoliata L. indigenous
 Crassula perfoliata L. var. coccinea (Sweet) G.D.Rowley, endemic
 Crassula perfoliata L. var. heterotricha (Schinz) Toelken, indigenous
 Crassula perfoliata L. var. minor (Haw.) G.D.Rowley, endemic
 Crassula perfoliata L. var. perfoliata, endemic
 Crassula perforata Thunb. indigenous
 Crassula perforata Thunb. subsp. kougaensis Van Jaarsv. & A.E.van Wyk, indigenous
 Crassula perforata Thunb. subsp. perforata, endemic
 Crassula picturata Boom, accepted as Crassula exilis Harv. subsp. picturata (Boom) G.D.Rowley, indigenous
 Crassula planifolia Schonland, endemic
 Crassula plegmatoides Friedrich, indigenous
 Crassula portulacaria L. accepted as Portulacaria afra Jacq. indigenous
 Crassula portulacea Lam. accepted as Crassula ovata (Mill.) Druce, indigenous
 Crassula pruinosa L. endemic
 Crassula pseudohemisphaerica Friedrich, indigenous
 Crassula pubescens Thunb. indigenous
 Crassula pubescens Thunb. subsp. pubescens, endemic
 Crassula pubescens Thunb. subsp. radicans (Haw.) Toelken, endemic
 Crassula pubescens Thunb. subsp. rattrayi (Schonland & Baker f.) Toelken, endemic
 Crassula pustulata Toelken, endemic
 Crassula pyramidalis Thunb. endemic
 Crassula rogersii Schonland, endemic
 Crassula roggeveldii Schonland, endemic
 Crassula rotundifolia Haw. accepted as Kalanchoe rotundifolia (Haw.) Haw. indigenous
 Crassula rubricaulis Eckl. & Zeyh. endemic
 Crassula rudolfii Schonland & Baker f. endemic
 Crassula rupestris Thunb. indigenous
 Crassula rupestris Thunb. subsp. commutata (Friedrich) Toelken, indigenous
 Crassula rupestris Thunb. subsp. marnierana (H.E.Huber & H.Jacobsen) Toelken, endemic
 Crassula rupestris Thunb. subsp. rupestris, endemic
 Crassula sarcocaulis Eckl. & Zeyh. indigenous
 Crassula sarcocaulis Eckl. & Zeyh. subsp. rupicola Toelken, indigenous
 Crassula sarcocaulis Eckl. & Zeyh. subsp. sarcocaulis, indigenous
 Crassula sarmentosa Harv. indigenous
 Crassula sarmentosa Harv. var. integrifolia Toelken, endemic
 Crassula sarmentosa Harv. var. sarmentosa, endemic
 Crassula saxifraga Harv. endemic
 Crassula scabra L. endemic
 Crassula sebaeoides (Eckl. & Zeyh.) Toelken, endemic
 Crassula sediflora (Eckl. & Zeyh.) Endl. & Walp. indigenous
 Crassula sediflora (Eckl. & Zeyh.) Endl. & Walp. var. amatolica (Schonland) Toelken, endemic
 Crassula sediflora (Eckl. & Zeyh.) Endl. & Walp. var. sediflora, indigenous
 Crassula sericea Schonland, indigenous
 Crassula sericea Schonland var. hottentotta (Marloth & Schonland) Toelken, indigenous
 Crassula sericea Schonland var. sericea, indigenous
 Crassula sericea Schonland var. velutina (Friedrich) Toelken, indigenous
 Crassula setulosa Harv. indigenous
 Crassula setulosa Harv. var. deminuta (Diels) Toelken, endemic
 Crassula setulosa Harv. var. jenkinsii Schonland, endemic
 Crassula setulosa Harv. var. longiciliata Toelken, indigenous
 Crassula setulosa Harv. var. rubra (N.E.Br.) G.D.Rowley, indigenous
 Crassula setulosa Harv. var. setulosa forma setulosa, indigenous
 Crassula simulans Schonland, endemic
 Crassula sladenii Schonland, indigenous
 Crassula smithii Van Jaarsv. D.G.A.Styles & G.J.McDonald, indigenous
 Crassula socialis Schonland, endemic
 Crassula southii Schonland, indigenous
 Crassula southii Schonland subsp. southii, endemic
 Crassula southii Schonland subsp. sphaerocephala Toelken, endemic
 Crassula spathulata Thunb. endemic
 Crassula streyi Toelken, endemic
 Crassula strigosa L. endemic
 Crassula subacaulis Schonland & Baker f. indigenous
 Crassula subacaulis Schonland & Baker f. subsp. erosula (N.E.Br.) Toelken, indigenous
 Crassula subacaulis Schonland & Baker f. subsp. subacaulis, endemic
 Crassula subaphylla (Eckl. & Zeyh.) Harv. indigenous
 Crassula subaphylla (Eckl. & Zeyh.) Harv. var. subaphylla, indigenous
 Crassula subaphylla (Eckl. & Zeyh.) Harv. var. virgata (Harv.) Toelken, endemic
 Crassula subulata L. endemic
 Crassula subulata L. var. fastigiata (Schonland) Toelken, endemic
 Crassula subulata L. var. hispida Toelken, endemic
 Crassula subulata L. var. subulata, endemic
 Crassula susannae Rauh & Friedrich, endemic
 Crassula swaziensis Schonland, indigenous
 Crassula swaziensis Schonland var. swaziensis forma argyrophylla, accepted as Crassula swaziensis Schonland 
 Crassula swaziensis Schonland var. swaziensis forma swaziensis, accepted as Crassula swaziensis Schonland, present
 Crassula tabularis Dinter, indigenous
 Crassula tecta Thunb. endemic
 Crassula tenuicaulis Schonland, indigenous
 Crassula tenuipedicellata Schonland & Baker f. indigenous
 Crassula tetragona L. indigenous
 Crassula tetragona L. subsp. acutifolia (Lam.) Toelken, endemic
 Crassula tetragona L. subsp. connivens (Schonland) Toelken, endemic
 Crassula tetragona L. subsp. lignescens Toelken, endemic
 Crassula tetragona L. subsp. robusta (Toelken) Toelken, endemic
 Crassula tetragona L. subsp. rudis (Schonland & Baker f.) Toelken, endemic
 Crassula tetragona L. subsp. tetragona, endemic
 Crassula thunbergiana Schult. indigenous
 Crassula thunbergiana Schult. subsp. minutiflora (Schonland & Baker f.) Toelken, indigenous
 Crassula thunbergiana Schult. subsp. thunbergiana, endemic
 Crassula tomentosa Thunb. indigenous
 Crassula tomentosa Thunb. var. glabrifolia (Harv.) G.D.Rowley, indigenous
 Crassula tomentosa Thunb. var. tomentosa, indigenous
 Crassula tuberella Toelken, indigenous
 Crassula umbella Jacq. endemic
 Crassula umbellata Thunb. endemic
 Crassula umbraticola N.E.Br. indigenous
 Crassula vaginata Eckl. & Zeyh. indigenous
 Crassula vaginata Eckl. & Zeyh. subsp. vaginata, indigenous
 Crassula vaillantii (Willd.) Roth, not indigenous, naturalised
 Crassula vestita Thunb. endemic
 Crassula werneri N.Jacobsen, endemic
 Crassula whiteheadii Harv. indigenous

Kalanchoe
Genus Kalanchoe:
 Kalanchoe alticola Compton, indigenous
 Kalanchoe beharensis Drake, not indigenous, cultivated, naturalised, invasive
 Kalanchoe brachyloba Welw. ex Britten, indigenous
 Kalanchoe crenata (Andrews) Haw. indigenous
 Kalanchoe crenata (Andrews) Haw. subsp. crenata var. crenata, accepted as Kalanchoe crenata (Andrews) Haw. present
 Kalanchoe crundallii I.Verd. endemic
 Kalanchoe decumbens Compton, accepted as Kalanchoe rotundifolia (Haw.) Haw. 
 Kalanchoe fedtschenkoi Raym.-Hamet & H.Perrier, not indigenous, naturalised
 Kalanchoe lanceolata (Forssk.) Pers. indigenous
 Kalanchoe leblanciae Raym.-Hamet, indigenous
 Kalanchoe longiflora Schltr. ex J.M.Wood, endemic
 Kalanchoe longiflora Schltr. ex J.M.Wood var. coccinea Marn.-Lap. accepted as Kalanchoe sexangularis N.E.Br. var. sexangularis 
 Kalanchoe luciae Raym.-Hamet, indigenous
 Kalanchoe luciae Raym.-Hamet subsp. luciae, indigenous
 Kalanchoe luciae Raym.-Hamet subsp. montana (Compton) Toelken, indigenous
 Kalanchoe mossambicana Resende ex Resende & Sobr. accepted as Kalanchoe sexangularis N.E.Br. var. sexangularis 
 Kalanchoe neglecta Toelken, endemic
 Kalanchoe paniculata Harv. indigenous
 Kalanchoe praesidentis-vervoerdii Raym.-Hamet, accepted as Kalanchoe brachyloba Welw. ex Britten 
 Kalanchoe rogersii Raym.-Hamet, accepted as Kalanchoe sexangularis N.E.Br. var. sexangularis, indigenous
 Kalanchoe rotundifolia (Haw.) Haw. indigenous
 Kalanchoe rotundifolia (Haw.) Haw. forma peltata Raym.-Hamet ex R.Fern. accepted as Kalanchoe neglecta Toelken, indigenous
 Kalanchoe rotundifolia (Haw.) Haw. forma tripartita Raym.-Hamet ex R.Fern. accepted as Kalanchoe rotundifolia (Haw.) Haw. indigenous
 Kalanchoe rubinea Toelken, accepted as Kalanchoe sexangularis N.E.Br. var. sexangularis, indigenous
 Kalanchoe sexangularis N.E.Br. indigenous
 Kalanchoe sexangularis N.E.Br. var. sexangularis, indigenous
 Kalanchoe thyrsiflora Harv. indigenous
 Kalanchoe vatrinii Raym.-Hamet, accepted as Kalanchoe sexangularis N.E.Br. var. sexangularis 
 Kalanchoe waterbergensis Van Jaarsv. endemic
 Kalanchoe winteri Gideon F.Sm. N.R.Crouch & Mich.Walters, endemic

Toelkenia
Genus Toelkenia:
 Toelkenia arborescens (Mill.) P.V.Heath, accepted as Crassula arborescens (Mill.) Willd. subsp. arborescens, indigenous
 Toelkenia lactea (Sol.) P.V.Heath, accepted as Crassula lactea Sol. indigenous
 Toelkenia ovata (Mill.) P.V.Heath, accepted as Crassula ovata (Mill.) Druce, indigenous

Tylecodon
Genus Tylecodon:
 Tylecodon albiflorus Bruyns, endemic
 Tylecodon atropurpureus Bruyns, endemic
 Tylecodon bayeri Van Jaarsv. endemic
 Tylecodon bleckiae G.Will. indigenous
 Tylecodon boddleyi Van Jaarsv. endemic
 Tylecodon buchholzianus (Schuldt & P.Stephan) Toelken, indigenous
 Tylecodon buchholzianus (Schuldt & P.Stephan) Toelken subsp. buchholzianus, indigenous
 Tylecodon buchholzianus (Schuldt & P.Stephan) Toelken subsp. fasciculatus G.Will. endemic
 Tylecodon cacalioides (L.f.) Toelken, endemic
 Tylecodon celatus Van Jaarsv. & Tribble, endemic
 Tylecodon cordiformis G.Will. endemic
 Tylecodon decipiens Toelken, endemic
 Tylecodon ellaphieae Van Jaarsv. endemic
 Tylecodon faucium (Poelln.) Toelken, endemic
 Tylecodon florentii Van Jaarsv. endemic
 Tylecodon fragilis (R.A.Dyer) Toelken, endemic
 Tylecodon grandiflorus (Burm.f.) Toelken, endemic
 Tylecodon hallii (Toelken) Toelken, indigenous
 Tylecodon hirtifolius (W.F.Barker) Toelken, endemic
 Tylecodon jarmilae Halda, accepted as Tylecodon ventricosus (Burm.f.) Toelken, present
 Tylecodon kritzingeri Van Jaarsv. endemic
 Tylecodon leucothrix (C.A.Sm.) Toelken, endemic
 Tylecodon longipes Van Jaarsv. & G.Will. endemic
 Tylecodon mallei G.Will. endemic
 Tylecodon nigricaulis G.Will. & Van Jaarsv. endemic
 Tylecodon nolteei Lavranos, endemic
 Tylecodon occultans (Toelken) Toelken, endemic
 Tylecodon opelii Van Jaarsv. & S.A.Hammer, endemic
 Tylecodon paniculatus (L.f.) Toelken, indigenous
 Tylecodon pearsonii (Schonland) Toelken, indigenous
 Tylecodon peculiaris Van Jaarsv. endemic
 Tylecodon petrophilus Van Jaarsv. & A.E.van Wyk, endemic
 Tylecodon pusillus Bruyns, endemic
 Tylecodon pygmaeus (W.F.Barker) Toelken, endemic
 Tylecodon pygmaeus (W.F.Barker) Toelken var. tenuis (Toelken) Toelken, accepted as Tylecodon tenuis (Toelken) Bruyns, endemic
 Tylecodon racemosus (Harv.) Toelken, indigenous
 Tylecodon reticulatus (L.f.) Toelken, indigenous
 Tylecodon reticulatus (L.f.) Toelken subsp. phyllopodium Toelken, indigenous
 Tylecodon reticulatus (L.f.) Toelken subsp. reticulatus, indigenous
 Tylecodon rubrovenosus (Dinter) Toelken, indigenous
 Tylecodon scandens Van Jaarsv. accepted as Tylecodon tenuis (Toelken) Bruyns, present
 Tylecodon schaeferianus (Dinter) Toelken, indigenous
 Tylecodon similis (Toelken) Toelken, indigenous
 Tylecodon stenocaulis Bruyns, endemic
 Tylecodon striatus (Hutchison) Toelken, endemic
 Tylecodon suffultus Bruyns ex Toelken, endemic
 Tylecodon sulphureus (Toelken) Toelken, endemic
 Tylecodon sulphureus (Toelken) Toelken var. armianus Van Jaarsv. endemic
 Tylecodon sulphureus (Toelken) Toelken var. sulphureus, endemic
 Tylecodon tenuis (Toelken) Bruyns, endemic
 Tylecodon torulosus Toelken, endemic
 Tylecodon tribblei Van Jaarsv. endemic
 Tylecodon tuberosus Toelken, endemic
 Tylecodon ventricosus (Burm.f.) Toelken, endemic
 Tylecodon viridiflorus (Toelken) Toelken, endemic
 Tylecodon wallichii (Harv.) Toelken, indigenous
 Tylecodon wallichii (Harv.) Toelken subsp. ecklonianus (Harv.) Toelken, indigenous
 Tylecodon wallichii (Harv.) Toelken subsp. wallichii, endemic

Haloragaceae
 Family: Haloragaceae,

Laurembergia
Genus Laurembergia:
 Laurembergia repens (L.) P.J.Bergius, indigenous
 Laurembergia repens (L.) P.J.Bergius subsp. brachypoda (Welw. ex Hiern) Oberm. indigenous

Myriophyllum
Genus Myriophyllum:
 Myriophyllum aquaticum (Vell.) Verdc. not indigenous, naturalised, invasive
 Myriophyllum spicatum L. not indigenous, naturalised, invasive

Hamamelidaceae
 Family: Hamamelidaceae,

Trichocladus
Genus Trichocladus:
 Trichocladus crinitus (Thunb.) Pers. endemic
 Trichocladus ellipticus Eckl. & Zeyh. indigenous
 Trichocladus ellipticus Eckl. & Zeyh. subsp. ellipticus, endemic
 Trichocladus grandiflorus Oliv. indigenous

References

South African plant biodiversity lists
Saxifragales